Coleophora adilella is a moth of the family Coleophoridae that is endemic to Mongolia.

References

External links

adilella
Moths described in 1975
Moths of Asia
Endemic fauna of Mongolia